The Mexican Air Force (FAM) is the air service branch of the Mexican Armed Forces. It is a component of the Mexican Army and depends on the National Defense Secretariat (SEDENA). The objective of the FAM is to defend the integrity, independence, and sovereignty of Mexico. Its auxiliary tasks include internal security, assisting with public works, and natural disaster management. Since December 2017, its commander is Miguel Enrique Vallín Osuna.

History

Mexican Revolution 

The air force exclusively performed reconnaissance missions until 10 May 1913, when Didier Masson and a Joaquín Bauche Alcalde dropped 15 kilograms of dynamite on rebel boats. Although the attack did not cause any damage below, it is the first known instance of air-to-sea bombing. Masson also performed leaflet drops, also considered the first ever done.

On February 5, 1915, the leader of the Constitutionalist Army, Venustiano Carranza, founded the Military Aviation Arm, which would become the current air force. Its first commander was Lt. Alberto Salinas Carranza.

Other rebellions 

When WWI Ace U.S. Colonel Ralph O'Neill was hired to head the restructuring of the Mexican Air Force in 1920, he reported to General Plutarco Elías Calles that most of the aircraft available had to be replaced. Until August 1920, the entire fleet consisted of 13 national made prototypes of mixed engine design. These were functional yet ill-equipped for battle, 4 being scout monoplanes. 5 others were in repair and over 20 more at the TNCA were obsolete or wrecked beyond repair. The branch initially consisted of 27 pilots, 17 of which were cadets. In anticipation of the new "Chief", a purchase was made of 13 French Farman F.50 night bombers. Commander O'Neill soon acquired 35 British made Avro 504K and Avro 504J airplanes, which later would be made in Mexico under the name . O'Neill was the first to introduce the term "Fuerza Aérea Mexicana" (FAM) naming the organization as such. The next step was the formation of classified fighter, bombing, observation and reconnaissance squadrons, as well as the decentralization of Air Force units throughout the country at strategic bases. O'Neill then set to work with his co-instructors German Fritz Bieler and Frenchman Joe Ben Lievre, using the first intercom known as the "Gosport System", invented by Robert Smith-Barry, in order to give in-air commands. O'Neill not only implemented new combat strategy, but also flew many decisive missions.

From 1923 to 1929, Mexico was immersed in a wave of violent territorial, religious and military armed rebellions, which required the new Air Force to quickly deploy support wherever the federal army requested them. These conflicts were resolved mostly by the assertive use of air superiority alone.

On December 7, 1923, former President Adolfo de la Huerta launched a military coup (delahuertista rebellion) against the government of President Álvaro Obregón. The situation was extremely critical, because along with de la Huerta, about 60% of the army revolted, including various high-ranking generals across the country. The power tilted back in favor of the federal forces when the United States agreed to furnish the Mexican government with a fleet of new de Havilland DH-4B aircraft equipped with the Liberty motor, armed with Lewis and Vickers machine guns and able to carry bombs. The military coup was suffocated by February 1924.

In 1925, due to the shortage of airplanes caused by World War I, Mexico set up the National Aviation Workshops (TNCA) to design and build its own airplanes and aeroengines.

A territorial war was that of the Sonora Yaqui Indians who demanded by force that previous territorial treaties were implemented. The conflict lasted from 1926 to 1927, and it came to an end when a new treaty was implemented.

When President Plutarco Elías Calles pushed for the creation of the 'Mexican Apostolic Catholic Church', independent of Rome, it unleashed a widespread religious war known as the Cristero War. This long civil war lasted from 1926 to 1929.

In May 1927, while General Obregón seemed keen to impose the presidency to General Calles, General Arnulfo R. Gómez launched a military coup against both Obregón and Calles. His command posts were located in the cities of Puebla and Veracruz, where he led approximately 200 federal deserters, ammunition and weapons. The air force played a key role in their defeat.

Then, on March 3, 1929, a serious military coup took place, led by General José Gonzalo Escobar and heeded by various other generals. In these days, the air force's remaining airplanes consisted of worn and shot Bristol F.2 Fighter, Bristol Boarhound, de Havilland DH-4B and Douglas O-2C, a force that was not suitable to defeat Escobar's power. In this context, the Mexican government convinced the U.S. government to promote the peace south of its border and quickly make available twelve new OU-2M Corsair with the 400 hp Wasp engine, nine Douglas O-2M, four Stearman C3B and six Waco Taper Wings. Only two weeks after making the request, the U.S. government agreed, and several Mexican pilots travelled to Brownsville, Texas, and New York to pick up the new aircraft. The key victory was decided in late March 1929 at the Battle of Jiménez, Chihuahua, where after several days of air raids, Escobar was defeated by General Calles, taking about 6000 prisoners. This rebellion was quite serious, since a third of the officials and nearly 30,000 soldiers rebelled; in two months, more than 2000 men had been killed.

In May 1938, the Governor of San Luis Potosí, General Saturnino Cedillo, declared himself in rebellion and President Lázaro Cárdenas travelled there to personally mount the campaign against the revolt. The Air Force organized a mixed fleet of 17 aircraft that included some new V-99M Corsair, engaging the enemy assertively when spotted. Cedillo quickly realized he had no chance in open fields against the air force and ran to the Huasteca Hills, where his men dispersed, abandoning him.

With the imminent collapse of the Spanish Republic in 1939, the Mexican government took delivery of military aircraft destined for the Republic, strengthening its arsenal.

World War II 

The Escuadrón 201, a P-47D fighter squadron of the Fuerza Aérea Expedicionaria Mexicana (Mexican Expeditionary Air Force), served in the Pacific War against the Empire of Japan during World War II.  It consisted of 25 aircraft and had 300 airmen and supporting staff. The 201st Squadron, completed 96 combat missions over the Philippines (Battle of Luzon) and Formosa (Taiwan). It is the only unit of the Mexican armed forces ever to see overseas combat.

Cold War era 
The first jet aircraft operated by the Mexican Air Force was the subsonic de Havilland Vampire Mk.I. Mexico received 17 Vampires during late 1960 and early 1961. This jet was nicknamed "The Flying Avocado" by Mexican flight crews due to the ovoid shape of its fuselage and the dark green night camouflage adopted by its first units. The Vampires were not popular with Mexican fighter pilots because of its lack of ejection seats. The FAM finally retired them in 1970.

The Mexican Vampires were initially complemented by 15 Lockheed T-33 Shooting Star subsonic fighter aircraft received also in late 1961. Because of its more modern design, an ejection seat system and several other attributes, the T-33 was well liked by most FAM pilots and became a huge success as a patrol and interceptor aircraft. During the seventies and early eighties an additional 20 or more T-33s were procured by the FAM to replace aircraft lost in accidents and to increase the size of the fleet after the retirement of the Vampires.

In 1982, the FAM received 12 Northrop F-5E/F Tiger II jets (10 F-5Es and 2 F-5Fs). The F-5 gave Mexico its first supersonic platform and saw the formation of Air Squadron 401. Since the 1980s the F-5 became the main Mexican fighter jet while the remaining operational T-33s were used for subsonic support and light attack roles.

In 1983 one F-5E was lost in an accident that occurred during a target practice exercise in the state of Chihuahua.

Chiapas conflict 

On January 1, 1994, the day the North American Free Trade Agreement (NAFTA) came into effect, hundreds of guerrillas from the previously unknown Zapatista Army of National Liberation (EZLN) occupied several towns and cities in the southern state of Chiapas.

The FAM was mobilized to support Army units, sending almost every available helicopter to the territory of operations. Units involved included the recently formed 214th and 215th Special Operations Squadrons, equipped with a mix of Bell 212 assault- and MD.530F scout helicopters. Up to 40 helicopters were deployed to support an initial deployment of 10,000 ground troops.

Bell 212s were armed in two configurations: for fire support with twin MAG 7.62-mm gun pods and cabin-mounted GPMGs; or as gunship, with LAU-32 70-mm rocket launchers, a twin MAG gun-pod and cabin mounted MAG GPMGs.

Pumas, Bell 205s, 206s and 212s from the 209th were also deployed, however, FAM's helicopter assets were scarce and the Mexican Army had to rely on almost every other government agency's helicopters for general support tasks. Almost any flyable aircraft from the National Attorney's Office (PGR) was also deployed, including Bell 206s and 212s, as well as the Navy's recently acquired Mi-8MTV-1s. Eventually the Army deployed some 70,000 ground troops and air support proved to be insufficient; hence the decision was taken to considerably expand the FAM's helicopter fleet.

By December 1994, FAM had bought additional 12 armed MD.530MG 'Defender' and four UH-60L Blackhawk helicopters, which it grouped into the 216th Special Operations Squadron. This unit was the spearhead of operation "Arco Iris" (Rainbow) to re-take several towns that had fallen under rebel control in January 1994. The new militarized Defenders came armed with M2AC machine-guns and LAU-68A 70-mm rocket launchers. Three additional units were ordered in 1996 and delivered as attrition replacements in March 1998. Black
Hawks wore 1191 to 1194 serials and are being used for special operations.

Although the FAM received 18 surplus Bell 206s from the Attorney General's office (PGR) in the mid-1990s, the main need identified by the FAM High Command was for a new fleet of transport helicopters that would allow it to support the Army with an adequate airlift capability.

Recent times 

On September 16, 1995, after more than 30 yearly military parade flights without incidents, an F-5E collided in mid-air with three Lockheed T-33s during the parade for the Independence of Mexico. All aircraft were lost and a total of 10 deaths occurred. Since then, for safety reasons, military parade flyovers in Mexico have been smaller in participation.

In 2004, the Mexican Air Force recorded a UFO sighting over southern Campeche.

In 2007, after more than 45 years in service, the last operational T-33s were retired. In 2012, the F-5 fighter jets had their 30th anniversary in Mexican Air Force service. Due to high operating costs, lack of parts, and the extreme age of the aircraft, the Mexican Air Force retired all but 3 F-5s in late 2017. In early 2019, the Mexican Air Force received repaired engines for their F-5 fighters, as part of an effort to return a handful of the aircraft to operational status.

Because of the ongoing Mexican Drug War, increasing importance has been placed on acquiring airborne surveillance platforms, UAVs, light attack aircraft, helicopters and rapid troop transports.

On 21 February 2021, a Learjet 45XR operated by the Mexican Air Force crashed while taking off from El Lencero Airport in Veracruz, killing all six people on board.

Structure 

A national commander under the orders of the Secretary of National Defense is in charge of the Mexican Air Force. The second-in-command is the Air Force Chief of Staff, who supervises a Deputy Chief of Operations and a Deputy Chief of Management. The Air Force divides the country's territory into four regions: Northwestern (Mexicali, Baja California), Northeastern (Chihuahua, Chihuahua), Central (Mexico City) and Southeastern (Tuxtla Gutiérrez, Chiapas); each region is commanded by a general. The regional headquarters are in charge of 18 air bases across the country:

Ranks 
Air Force ranks are the same as in Mexico's Army, with the exception of generals.

Officer ranks

Other ranks

Pilot selection and training  
The FAM offers higher education, middle education, technical training, tactical training and specialized technical training in its various campuses:

Air Force Academy 

Since the National School of Aviation was opened in 1915, it took different names over the years until finally, in 1959 it joined the military school of meteorology, mechanics and aviation specialists, forming the leading campus in military aviation education: 'El Colegio del Aire' (Air Force Academy), which since September 9, 1959, has guided the formation of Air Force officers. The Air Force Academy is an all academic institution of the Mexican Air Force and comprises four schools: 'Military Aviation School', 'Maintenance and Supply Military School', 'Air Force Military Specialist School', and the 'Military Troops' Air Force Speciaslist School'.

Military Aviation School (EMA) 
Admission to the Air Force is through the mechanism of military recruitment that takes place every year at The Ministry of Defense. The FAM currently offers tertiary level studies – highlighting that of Military Pilot, which spans 4 years at the facilities of the Air Force Academy located on the Military Air Base No. 5 in Zapopan, Jalisco.

The subjects taught in pilot training include: tactics of the branches of aviation, general aviation tactics, meteorology, air navigation, air traffic control, radio communications and culture in general, along with approximately 250 hours of flight. During the first year, the training is theoretical. During the second year, Beechcraft Bonanza aircraft are used for flight instruction. During the third the cadets are trained Aermacchi SF260EU for aerobatics, and later on Pilatus PC-7 for advanced flight tactics, including combat. Within each of these stages, the cadets are trained in aerial acrobatics, stage tactical instrument flight, visual flying rules (VFR), radio operations, among others, which increase in complexity as the cadets' training progresses. The first female aviator to graduate as a pilot in the history of FAM, Andrea Cruz, became a cadet at the Military Aviation School in 2007.

Military Air Force Specialist School (EMEFA) 
Military School of Air Force Specialist offers a comprehensive scholarship lasting three years for officer training meteorologists and flight control, obtaining at the graduate level of lieutenant. His duties are to provide meteorological information and control of military or civil aircraft.

School of the Air Force Specialists (EMEFA) 
Military School of the Air Forces specialists is an
establishment of military education that has as its mission to train sergeants in seconds
aviation maintenance, supply lines, electronic
aviation and military aviation. The school is located in the St. Lucía military base.

Military School of Maintenance and Supply (EMMA) 
In this school, officers are trained as aviation maintenance specialists, aviation electronics specialists, weapons and air supply lines.

Recruitment 
To enter any of the campuses of the Air Force, SEDENA convenes a competitive entrance examination which is held each year. The requirements are:

 Mexican citizenship and have no other nationality
 Be the son of Mexican born parents
 Minimum age of 15 years at December 31 of the year in course
 Maximum age of 20 years at December 31 of the year in course
 Have completed high school or equivalent
 Minimum height of 1.65 m (5’-5”)

In order to be admitted to any school of the Mexican Air Force Academy mentioned above, the applicant should also perform the following tests: physical, medical, cultural, and aviation psychology. In some cases, the psychological aeromedical 2nd level examination may also be required.

Current inventory

See also 
Mexican Naval Aviation

References

Bibliography

External links 
 History of the Mexican Air Force.(in Spanish)
 Planes and helicopters of the Mexican Air Force (in Spanish).

Ralph O'Neal en Mexico

 
Military of Mexico
1913 establishments in Mexico